Willem Rooseboom (9 March 1843 – 6 March 1920) was a Dutch Major General and politician. He was Governor-General of the Dutch East Indies from 1899 until 1904.

References

External links 
 

1843 births
1920 deaths
Governors-General of the Dutch East Indies
Royal Netherlands Army officers
Liberal Union (Netherlands) politicians
Members of the House of Representatives (Netherlands)
Military personnel from Amsterdam
Commanders of the Order of the Netherlands Lion
Grand Crosses of the Order of the Dannebrog
Knights Grand Cross of the Order of Orange-Nassau
Knights Grand Cross of the Royal Order of Cambodia
20th-century Dutch East Indies people
19th-century Dutch East Indies people
Politicians from Amsterdam